Flavio Cipolla and Máximo González were the defending champions but chose not to defend their title.

Marcelo Demoliner and Fabrício Neis won the title after defeating Salvatore Caruso and Alessandro Giannessi 6–1, 3–6, [10–5] in the final.

Seeds

Draw

References
 Main Draw

Internazionali di Tennis dell'Umbria - Doubles
2016 Doubles